This is a list of notable electronic mailing list software, which facilitate the widespread distribution of email to many Internet users.

Systems listed on a light purple background are no longer in active development.

References 

Mailing list software
Mailing list software